This is a list of notable Hispanic and Latino American actors.

To be included in this list, the person must have a Wikipedia article and/or references showing the person is an American of Hispanic and Latino origin and a notable actor.

The list is organized in chronological order of birth decades. The names are organised in alphabetical order.

LIST

1870s 
 Bijou Fernandez (1877 – 1961) Broadway actress from New York City

1880s 
 Teresa Luisa Michelena (1889 – 1941) American actress and screenwriter  known as Donna Barrell. She was daughter of Venezuelan born  tenor Fernando Michelena (1858–1921)
 Leo Carrillo (1880-1961) Californio actor best known for playing Pancho in the popular television series The Cisco Kid (1950–1956)
 Steve Clemente (1885 – 1950) Mexican-understanding  American actor known for his many villainous roles
 Pedro de Cordoba (1881-1950) American actor of Cuban and French descent
 Al Ernest Garcia (1887–1938) American actor of Mexican descent 
 Vera Michelena (1885–1961) American actress and contralto prima donna. She was daughter of Venezuelan born tenor Fernando Michelena and half sister of Donna Barrell.
 Antonio Moreno (1887-1967) Spanish-born American actor

1890s 
 William Gaxton (1893–1963) Californio actor and cousin of Leo Carrillo
 Myrtle Gonzalez (1891–1918) American actress of Californio and Irish descent
 Chris-Pin Martin (1893–1953) American actor of Mexican descent
 Beatriz Michelena (1890–1942) American actress and singer. She was sister of Vera Michelena
 Ramon Novarro (1899-1968) Mexican-born American actor
 Carlos De Valdez (1894–1939) - Peruvian-born American film actor.

1900s 
 Don Alvarado (1904-1967) American actor of Mexican descent
 Thomas Gomez (1905-1971) American actor of Spaniard descent
 Linda Loredo (1907–1931) American actress of Mexican descent
 Carlos Montalbán (1903-1991) Mexican-born American actor
 Ramon Novarro (1899-1968) Mexican-born American actor
 Dolores del Río (1904-1983) Mexican-born American actress
 Gilbert Roland (1905-1994) Mexican-born American actor
 Cesar Romero (1907-1994) American actor of Cuban and Spaniard descent
 Raquel Torres (1908-1987) Mexican-born American actress of Mexican and German descent
 Lupe Vélez (1908-1944) Mexican-born American actress

1910s 
 Rico Alaniz (1919–2015) Mexican-born American actor in film and television (The Life and Legend of Wyatt Earp)
 Desi Arnaz (1917-1986) Cuban-born American actor (I Love Lucy)
 Pedro Armendariz (1912-1963) Mexican-born American actor
 Alma Beltran (1919 – 2007) Mexican-born American film, stage and television actress.
 Ralph Camargo (1912 – 1992) American actor of Mexican descent
 Movita Castaneda (1916–2015) American actress of Mexican descent
 José Ferrer (1912-1992) Puerto Rican-born American actor
 Mel Ferrer (1917-2008) American actor of Cuban and Irish descent
 Rita Hayworth (1918-1987) American actress to a Spanish father
 Tom Hernández (1915-1984) Spanish-born American actor
 Fernando Lamas (1916-1982) Argentine-born American actor
 Bill Melendez (1916–2008) Mexican-born American voice actor, character animator, film director and producer (Peanuts animated specials)
 Maria Montez (1912-1951) Dominican-born American actress
 Anthony Quinn (1915-2001) Mexican-born American actor
 Mona Rico (1907–1994) Mexican-born American actress
 Andy Russell (1919-1992) American actor and singer to Mexican immigrant parents
 Ref Sanchez (1917-1986) American actor of Spaniard descent
 Renee Torres (1911 – 1998) Mexican American actress and the sister of Raquel Torres.  
 Lupita Tovar (1910-2016) Mexican-born American actress
 Lupe Vélez (1908-1944) Mexican-born American actress who was one of the first successful Latin American actresses in the United States
 Natividad Vacío (1912–1996) American actor of Mexican descent

1920s 
 Rodolfo Acosta (1920-1974) American actor of Mexican descent
 Sammy Davis Jr. (1925 – 1990) American actor, singer, dancer, vaudevillian, and comedian. He was son of the American dancer and stage performer Elvera Sanchez (1905–2000). His mother was of Cuban descent. 
 Rebeca Iturbide (1924–2003) American actress of Mexican descent
 Pedro Gonzalez-Gonzalez (1925–2006) American actor of Mexican descent
 Pepe Hern (1927-2009) American actor of Spanish descent. He was brother of Tom Hernández
 Katy Jurado (1924-2002) Mexican-born American actress
 Tony Martinez (1920 – 2002) Puerto Rican-born American film, television and theatre actor.
 Ricardo Montalbán (1920-2009) Mexican-born American actor
 Luis Oquendo (1925 – 1992) Cuban-born American actor
 Antonia Rey (1926–2019), Cuban-born American actress
 Lalo Ríos (1927-1973) Mexican-born American actor
 Marquita Rivera (1922–2002) Puerto Rican-born American actress, singer and dancer
 Olga San Juan (1927–2009) American actress of Puerto Rican descent
 Carmen Zapata (1927–2014) American actress of Mexican and Argentine descent

1930s 
 Victor Argo (1934–2004) American actor of Puerto Rican descent 
 Rafael Campos (1936 - 1985) Dominican-born American actor
 Míriam Colón (1936–2017) Puerto Rican-born American actress
 Linda Cristal (1931 - 2020) Argentinian-born  American actress
 Henry Darrow (born Enrique Tomás Delgado Jiménez; 1933–2021) American actor of Puerto Rican descent
 Raúl Dávila (1931–2006) Puerto Rican-born American actor (All My Children)
 Héctor Elizondo (1936-) New Yorker actor of Puerto Rican descent
 Hampton Fancher (1938-) American actor, screenwriter, and filmmaker to a Mexican-Danish mother (Blade Runner and Blade Runner 2049) 
 Abel Fernandez (1930-2016) American actor of Native Mexican descent
 John Gavin (1931-2018) American actor of Chilean and Mexican descent (Spartacus, Psycho)
 Susan Kohner (1936-) American actress to Mexican actress Lupita Tovar and American Jewish film producer Paul Kohner
 Joaquin Martinez (1930–2012) Mexican-born American actor
 Louisa Moritz (1936-2019) Cuban-born American actress and lawyer
 Rita Moreno (1931-) Puerto Rican-born American actress
 Alejandro Rey (1930–1987) Argentine-born American actor
 Chita Rivera (1933-) American actress to a Puerto Rican father.
 Paul Sand (1932-) American actor of Mexican and Russian descent
 Gregory Sierra (1937-2021) is an American actor of Puerto Rican descent

1940s 
 Robert Alvarez (1948-)
 Tina Aumont (1946 – 2006) American actress. She was the daughter of French actor Jean-Pierre Aumont and Dominican actress Maria Montez
 Barbara Carrera (1945-), Nicaraguan-born American film and television actress
 Enrique Castillo (1949-) 
 Emilio Delgado (1940-) American actor of Mexican descent
 Moctesuma Esparza (1949-) American actor of Mexican descent
 Erik Estrada (1949-)  American actor of Puerto Rican descent (CHiPs)
 Lola Falana (1942-) American actress and singer to an Afro-Cuban father.
 Antonio Fargas (1946-) American actor of Puerto Rican and Trinidadian descent
 Raul Julia (1940-1994) Puerto Rican-born American actor
Priscilla Lopez (1948-) American actress of Puerto Rican descent
 Cheech Marin (1946-) American actor of Mexican descent (part of the comedy act Cheech & Chong)
 Angélica María (1944-) American actress of Mexican descent and raised in Mexico
 A Martinez (1948-) American actor to a father of Mexican and Apache descent
 Yvette Mimieux (1942-) American retired television and film actress of French and Mexican descent
 Belita Moreno (1949) American actress of Mexican descent (George Lopez,  Perfect Strangers)
 Miguel Piñero (1946–1988) Puerto Rican-born American playwright, actor 
 Tina Romero (1949-) American actress of Mexican descent
 Mercedes Ruehl (1948-) American actress to a mother of Cuban and Irish ancestry
 Juana Samayoa (1948-) Guatemalan-American actress and television presenter.
Martin Sheen (1940-) American actor of Spanish and Irish descent.
 Edward James Olmos (1947-) American actor of Mexican descent (Miami Vice, Battlestar Galactica).
 Lupe Ontiveros (1942-2012) American actress of Mexican descent
 Liz Torres (1947-) American actress of Puerto Rican descent
 Danny Trejo (1944-) American actor of Mexican descent
 Raquel Welch (1940) American actress of Bolivian descent
 Holly Woodlawn (1946–2015) transgender Puerto Rican-born actress and Warhol superstar
 Victoria Wyndham (born Victoria Camargo; 1945-), American actress. She is the daughter of  Mexican-American stage and screen actor Ralph Camargo (Another World)

1950s 
 Juan Fernández de Alarcon (1956-) Dominican-born American actor
 Ana Alicia (1956-) Mexican-born American actress (Falcon Crest)
 María Conchita Alonso (1957-) Cuban-born Venezuelan-raised actress, singer and songwriter. She is naturalised in the US.
 Rick Aviles (1952–1995) American actor of Puerto Rican descent
 Desi Arnaz Jr. (1953-) American actor and musician. He is the son of Cuban actor Desi Arnaz and Lucille Ball
 Lucie Arnaz (1951-) is an American actress, singer, dancer, and producer. She is daughter of Desi Arnaz and Lucille Ball
 Steven Bauer (1956-) Cuban-born American actor
 Robert Beltran (1953-) American actor of Mexican descent (Star Trek: Voyager)
 Irene Cara (1959-) American singer, songwriter, dancer and actress of Puerto Rican and Cuban descent
 Lynda Carter (1951-) American actress to a Mexican mother (Wonder Woman)
 Roxann Dawson (1958-) American actress, producer, director, and writer (Star Trek: Voyager)
 Michael DeLorenzo (1959-) American actor, director, writer, producer, dancer, and musician of Puerto Rican and Italian descent
 Rosanna DeSoto (1950-) American actress of Mexican descent
 Emiliano Díez (1953-) Cuban-born American actor
 Shabba Doo (1955-2020) American actor, dancer, and choreographer of African American and Puerto Rican descent. 
 Miguel Ferrer (1955-2017) American actor. He was son of Puerto Rican actor Jose Ferrer.
 Andy García (1956-) Cuban-born American actor
 Luis Guzmán (1956-) Puerto Rican-born 
 Ruben Santiago-Hudson (1956-) American actor, playwright, and director of Puerto Rican and African American descent (Castle)
 Vincent Irizarry (1959-) American actor of Puerto Rican descent
 Apollonia Kotero (1959-) American singer, actress, former model and talent manager of Mexican descent
 Lorenzo Lamas (1958) American actor. He is  son of Argentine actor Fernando Lamas (Falcon Crest)
 Sebastián Ligarde (1954-) American actor of Tejano and Mexican descent
 Sunshine Logroño (1951-) American-born Puerto Rican actor to a Puerto Rican mother
 Sonia Manzano (1950-) American actress, screenwriter, author, speaker and singer-songwriter of Puerto Rican descent
 Julio Oscar Mechoso (1955 – 2017) Cuban-born American actor
 Olga Merediz (1956-) Cuban-born American actress and singer. 
 Taylor Negron (1957–2015) American actor of Puerto Rican descent
 Oscar Nunez (1958-) Cuban-born American actor (The Office. He was also a member of The Groundlings)
 Tony Oliver (1958-) Puerto Rican born American voice actor (Robotech, Fate/stay night, Lupin the Third). 
 Luis Saguar (1957–2009) American actor
 Marcelino Sánchez (1957–1986) Puerto Rican-born American actor
 Miguel Sandoval (1951-) American actor of Mexican descent
 Saundra Santiago (1957-) American actress of Cuban and Puerto Rican descent (Miami Vice)
 Silvana Gallardo (1953 – 2012) American film and television actress of Venezuelan descent
 Johnny Sanchez (1958-) American actor, writer, and film producer
 Jimmy Smits (1955-) American actor of Puerto Rican and Surinamese descent
 Madeleine Stowe (1958-) American actress to a Costa Rican mother 
 Elizabeth Peña (1959–2014) American actress, writer, panelist and musician of Cuban descent
 Tony Plana (1952-) Cuban-born American actor and director (Ugly Betty)
 Freddie Prinze (1954-1977) American stand-up comedian and actor of Puerto Rican and German descent
 Vanessa del Rio (1952-) American retired pornographic actress of Puerto Rican and Cuban descent
 José Rivera (1955-) Puerto Rican playwright living in Hollywood, California
 Marco Rodríguez (1953-)  
 Paul Rodriguez (1955-) Mexican-born American actor
 Rachel Ticotin (1958-) American film and television actress of Jewish and Puerto Rican descend
 Eddie Velez (1958-) American actor of Puerto Rican descent (The A-Team)
 Daniel Zacapa (1951-) Honduran-born American movie actor.

1960s 
 Rose Abdoo (1962 -), American actress and comedian. She is of Dominican and Lebanese descent (Gilmore Girls, That's So Raven).
 Carlos Alazraqui (1962-) American actor, stand-up comedian, impressionist, producer and screenwriter of Argentine descent (Reno 911!)
 Trini Alvarado (1967-) American actress of Spanish and Puerto Rican descent
 Nelson Ascencio (1964-) Cuban-born American actor and comedian (member in MADtv; Actor in The Hunger Games film series)
 Maria Canals-Barrera (1966-) American actress of Cuban descent (Wizards of Waverly Place)
 Maurice Benard (born Mauricio José Morales; 1963-) American actor of Salvadorian and Nicaraguan descent
 Benjamin Bratt (1963-) American actor to a Peruvian mother
 Jesse Borrego (1962-) American actor of Mexican descent (Fame, 24, Dexter).
 Danny Burstein (1964-) American actor and singer to a Costa Rican mother
 Néstor Carbonell (1967-) American actor of Cuban descent (Suddenly Susan, Lost, Bates Motel, The Dark Knight)
 Laura Cerón (1964-) Mexican-born American actress
 Kevin Corrigan (1969-). American actor to an Irish father and a Puerto Rican mother (Grounded for Life). 
 Raymond Cruz (1961-) American actor of Mexican descent (The Closer, Major Crimes, Breaking Bad)
 Idalis DeLeón (1969-) American actress of Afro Puerto Rican descent
 Joey Diaz (1963-) Cuban-born American comedian, actor, and podcast host.
 Sully Diaz (1960-) American actress of Puerto Rican descent
 Mónica Dionne (1967-) American actress of Mexican descent
  Colman Domingo (1969-) American actor, writer and director to a Belizean father of Guatemalan descent
 Michelle Forbes (1965-) American actress of partly Mexican descent (Guiding Light, Homicide: Life on the Street, True Blood)
 Daisy Fuentes (1966-) Cuban-born American actress
 Franky G (1965-) American film and television actor. He is of Puerto Rican descent
 Mo Gallini (1966-) American actor of Lebanese and Cuban descent
 Jsu Garcia (1963-) American actor of Cuban descent
 Carlos Gómez (1962-) American actor of Cuban descent 
 Ian Gomez (1965-) American actor of Puerto Rican and Russian Jewish descent (Felicity, Cougar Town)
 Marga Gomez (1960-) American actress of Cuban and Puerto Rican descent
 Laura Harring (née Martínez-Herring; 1964-) Mexican-born American actress  
 Salma Hayek (1966-) Mexican-born American actress
 Thom Adcox-Hernandez (1960-) American voice and television actor of Colombian descent (Falcon Crest, The Twisted Tales of Felix the Cat, Gargoyles)
 Gledys Ibarra (1960-) Venezuelan-born American actress  
 Eva LaRue (1966-) American actress of partially Puerto Rican descent (All My Children, CSI: Miami)
 Kamala Lopez American-born filmmaker, actress, writer, director, and political activist. She is of Venezuelan and Indian descent
 John Leguizamo (1964-) Colombian-born American actor
 George Lopez (1961-) American actor of Mexican descent
 Jennifer Lopez (1969-) American actress and singer of Puerto Rican descent 
 Faizon Love (1968-) Cuban-born American actor and comedian 
 Florencia Lozano (1969-) American actress of Argentine descent (One Life to Live)
 Vanessa Marcil (1968-) Her father is Mexican (General Hospital, Beverly Hills, 90210, Las Vegas)
 Eddie Marrero (1962-) American actor of Puerto Rican descent
 Constance Marie (1965-) American actress of Mexican descent (George Lopez)
 Carlos Mencia (1967-)  Honduran-born American comedian, writer, and actor
 Alex Meneses (1965-) American actress of Mexican and Ukrainian descent
 Jorge Merced (1965-) New York-based Puerto Rican actor, theatre director, and gay activist. 
 Esai Morales (1962-) American actor of Puerto Rican descent 
 Miguel A. Núñez Jr. (1964-) American actor of African American and Dominican descent
 John Ortiz (1968-)  American actor of Puerto Rican descent
 Rosie Perez (1964-) American actress of Puerto Rican descent
 Judy Reyes (1967-) American actress of Dominican descent (Scrubs, Devious Maids)
 Kamar de los Reyes (1967-) Puerto Rican-born American actor
 Philip Anthony-Rodriguez (1968-) American actor and voice actor (Jake 2.0 and video game Grand Theft Auto: Vice City)
 Valente Rodriguez (1964-) American actor of Mexican descent
 Nelson de la Rosa (1967/1968–2006), Dominican-born American actor and one of the shortest men of the 20th and 21st centuries.
 Johnny A. Sanchez (1968-) American stand-up comedian and actor of Mexican descent
 Lauren Sánchez (1969-) American actress, news anchor, entertainment reporter, media personality, producer, pilot and entrepreneur. She is of Mexican descent
 Talisa Soto (1967-) American actress of Puerto Rican descent  
 Gina Torres (1969-) American actress of Cuban descent (Suits)
 Oscar Torre - (1967-) American actor of Cuban descent
 Benicio del Toro (1967-) Puerto Rican-born American actor
 Gabriel Traversari (1963-) American actor and director of Nicaraguan descent
 Rose Troche (1964-) – American film and television director, television producer, and screenwriter of Puerto Rican descent
 Randy Vasquez (1961-) American actor and director to a Mexican father
 Yul Vazquez (1965-) Cuban-born American actor and musician. 
 Daphne Rubin-Vega (1969-) Panamanian-born American actress, dancer and singer-songwriter. 
 Lauren Vélez (1964-) American actress of Puerto Rican descent (Dexter, Ugly Betty, Oz)
 Lorraine Vélez (1964-) American actress of Puerto Rican descent. She is sister of Lauren Vélez
 Lisa Vidal (1965-) American actress of Puerto Rican descent (Third Watch, The Division, ER, and The Event)
 David Zayas (1962-) Puerto Rican-born New Yorker raised (Dexter)
 Daphne Zuniga (1962-) American actress to a Guatemalan father
 José Zúñiga (1965-) Honduran-born American actor.

1970s  
 Kirk Acevedo (1971-) American actor of Puerto Rican descent
 Laz Alonso (1974-) American actor of Afro-Cuban descent.
 Kevin Alejandro (1976-) American actor to Mexican parents (Southland, Lucifer, True Blood) 
 Tatyana Ali (1979-) American actress. Her mother is Afro-Panamanian (The Fresh Prince of Bel-Air) 
 Daniella Alonso (1978-) American actress of Puerto Rican and Peruvian descent
 Cristela Alonzo (1979-) American comedian, actress, writer and producer of Mexican descent
 Alexis Amore (born Fabiola Melgar García; 1978 -) Peruvian-born American pornographic actress and feature dancer
 Yancey Arias (1971-) American actor of Puerto Rican and Colombian descent
 Linda Arsenio (1978-) American actress to a Salvadoran mother
 Charlotte Ayanna (1976-).  Puerto Rican-born actress and former Miss Teen USA.
 Omar Avila - (1979-) Cuban-born American actor
 Rosa Blasi (1972-) American actress and therapist of partial Puerto Rican descent
 Lillo Brancato (1976-) Colombian-born American actor, although raised in an Italian-American family (A Bronx Tale, The Sopranos).
 Héctor Luis Bustamante (1972-) Colombian-born American actor.
 Vladimir Caamaño (1979-) American comedian and actor of Dominican descent
 Bobby Cannavale, American actor of Italian and Cuban descent (Third Watch, Will & Grace)
 Steve Cardenas (1974-) American martial artist, musician, and semi retired actor of Mexican descent (Mighty Morphin Power Rangers)
 Matt Cedeño (1974-) American actor and former male fashion model of Afro-Cuban and English-Irish descent (Days of Our Lives)
 Eddie Cibrian (1973-) American actor of Cuban descent (CSI: Miami)
 Ricardo Antonio Chavira (1971-) American actor of Mexican descent (Desperate Housewives)
 Charissa Chamorro (1977-) American television actress of Chilean descent
 Mark Consuelos (1971-) Spanish-born American actor of Mexican and Italian descent (All My Children, Riverdale)
 Alexis Cruz (1974-) American actor of Puerto Rican descent (Touched by an Angel)
 Valerie Cruz (1976-) American actress of Cuban descent
 Wilson Cruz (1973-) American actor of Puerto Rican descent (Star Trek: Discovery)
 Rosario Dawson (1979-) American actress to a mother of Afro-Cuban and Puerto Rican ancestry (Marvel's Netflix television series, The Mandalorian)
 Kate del Castillo (1972-) Mexican-born American actress (Muchachitas, Alguna vez tendremos alas, La Mentira, Ramona, Bajo la misma piel).
 Cameron Diaz (1972-) American actress to a father of Cuban origin 
 Guillermo Díaz (1975-) American actor of Cuban descent (Scandal) 
 Felipe Esparza (1976-) Mexican-born American actor
 Raúl Esparza (1970-) American actor to Cuban parents (Law & Order: Special Victims Unit)
 Jade Esteban Estrada (1975-) American singer, actor, stand-up comedian, journalist and human rights activist pf Mexican descent. 
 David Fumero (1972-) Cuban-born American actor and former male fashion model (One Life to Live)
 Gene Gabriel (1970-) American actor and writer of Cuban descent
 Gloria Garayua (1978-) American film and television actress of Puerto Rican descent
 Paula Garcés (1974-) Colombian-born American film and TV actress (The Shield, All My Children)
 Aimee Garcia (1978-) Her mother is Mexican and her father is Puerto Rican (George Lopez, Lucifer).
 Jeffrey Garcia (1977-) American comedian, actor and voice actor of Mexican descent
 JoAnna García (1979-) American actress of Cuban and Spanish descent (Are You Afraid of the Dark?, Freaks and Geeks, Reba). 
 Jorge Garcia (1973-) American actor of Cuban and Chilean descent (Lost,  Alcatraz, Hawaii Five-0)
 Mayte Garcia (1973-)  American dancer, actress and singer of Puerto Rican descent
 Alana de la Garza (1976-) American actress of Mexican and Irish descent (Law & Order) 
 Mandy Gonzalez (1978-) American actress of Mexican and Jewish descent.
 Nicholas Gonzalez (1976-) American actor of Mexican descent (Resurrection Blvd., The Good Doctor)
 Rick Gonzalez (1979-) American actor of Puerto Rican and Dominican descent
 Adrian Grenier (1976-) American actor, producer, director, musician and environmentalist. His mother is of Mexican and French descent  (Entourage).
 La'Myia Good (1979-) – American actress. Her paternal grandmother is of Puerto Rican descent.
 Illich Guardiola (1972-) Honduran–born American voice actor 
 Camille Guaty (1978-) American actress of Puerto Rican and Cuban descent
 Elizabeth Gutiérrez (1979-) American actress of Mexican descent
 Zulay Henao (1979-) Colombian-born American actress 
 Wilson Jermaine Heredia (1971-) American actor of Dominican descent
 Jay Hernandez (1978-) American actor of Mexican descent
 Maximiliano Hernández (1973-) American actor of Honduran descent
 Gabriel Iglesias (1976) American actor of Mexican descent
 Oscar Isaac (1979-) Guatemalan-born American actor (Star Wars sequel trilogy, Marvel Cinematic Universe) 
 Cherie Johnson (1976-) American actress of Puerto Rican and African American descent (Punky Brewster, Family Matters)
 Josh Keaton - (1979-) American actor, singer and musical producer. His mother is of Peruvian origin.  
 David Lago (1979-) American actor of Cuban descent
 Selenis Leyva (1972-) American actress of Cuban and Dominican descent (Orange Is the New Black, Diary of a Future President). 
 Iyari Limón (1976-)  Mexican-born American actress
 Eva Longoria (1975-) American actress of Mexican descent
 Eric Lopez (1978-), American voice actor of Cuban descent (Young Justice) 
 Mario Lopez (1973-) American actor of Mexican descent (Saved by the Bell)
 Gina Lynn (1974-) Puerto Rican-born former pornographic actress, model, and stripper
 Al Madrigal (1971-) American comedian, writer, actor and producer of Mexican descent
 Alicia Machado (1976-) Venezuelan-born American actress
 Justina Machado (1972-) American actress of Puerto Rican descent (One Day at a Time, Six Feet Under, Queen of the South)
 Benito Martinez (1971) American actor of Guatemalan descent (The Shield)
 Ricardo Medina, Jr. (1977-) American former actor of Puerto Rican descent (Power Rangers Wild Force, Power Rangers Samurai)
 Eva Mendes (1974-) American actress of Cuban descent
 Enrique Murciano (1973-) American actor of Cuban descent (Without a Trace)
 Marisol Nichols (1973-) American actress of Mexican and Russian Jewish / Hungarian Jewish descent (24)
 Amaury Nolasco (1970-) Puerto Rican-born American actor (Prison Break)
 Rigo Nova (1979-)  Honduran-born American actor and writer
 America Olivo (1978-) American actress and singer to a father of Italian, Basque, Spanish and Chilean descent 
 Karen Olivo (1976-) American stage and television actress and singer to a father of Puerto Rican and Native American descent, and a mother of Dominican and Chinese descent
 Bodie Olmos (1975-) American actor of Mexican descent
 Ana Ortiz (1971-) American actress of Puerto Rican and Irish descent (Ugly Betty)
 Frank Pando (1971-) American actor of Chilean descent (The Sopranos)
 Lana Parrilla (1977-) American actress of Puerto Rican and Italian descent (Once Upon a Time, 24)
 Pedro Pascal (1975-) Chilean-born American actor (Game of Thrones, Narcos)
 George Perez (1972-) Puerto Rican actor living in the US
 Kika Perez (1979-) Colombian-born American actress
 Michael Peña (1976-) American actor of Mexican descent
 Danny Pino (1974-) American actor of Cuban descent (Cold Case)
 Carlos Ponce (1972-) Puerto Rican-born American actor
 Freddie Prinze Jr. (1976-) Son of American actor of Puerto Rican descent Freddie Prinze (I Know What You Did Last Summer, Scooby-Doo)
 Dania Ramirez (1979-) Dominican-born American actress (Heroes, The Sopranos, X-Men: The Last Stand)
 Efren Ramirez (1973-) American actor to Mexican and Salvadoran parents
 Marisa Ramirez (1977-) American actress of Mexican descent (Blue Bloods)
 Sara Ramirez (1975-) Mexican-born American actress (Grey's Anatomy)
 Luis Antonio Ramos (1973-) Puerto Rican-born American actor
 J. August Richards (1973-) American actor of Afro-Panamanian descent (Angel, Agents of S.H.I.E.L.D.)
 Lauren Ridloff (1978-) American actress of Mexican and African-American descent (The Walking Dead, Eternals)
 Bianca Del Rio (1975-) American  drag queen, comedian, actor, and costume designer and Cuban and Honduran descent
 James Roday (born James David Rodriguez; 1976-) American actor; father of Mexican descent (Psych, A Million Little Things) 
 Adam Rodriguez (1975-) American actor. He is three-quarters Puerto Rican and one-quarter Cuban (CSI: Miami, Criminal Minds).
 Aida Rodriguez (1977-) American actress of Puerto Rican and Dominican descent
 Freddy Rodriguez (1975-) American actor of Puerto Rican descent
 Jai Rodriguez (1979-) American actor and musician of Puerto Rican and Italian descent 
 Michelle Rodriguez (1978-). American actress of Puerto Rican and Dominican descent (Lost, Fast and Furious)
 Mel Rodriguez (1973-) American actor of Cuban descent (Getting On, The Last Man on Earth, On Becoming a God in Central Florida)
 Ramón Rodríguez (1979-) Puerto Rican-born New Yorker raised (The Wire, Day Break, Transformers: Revenge of the Fallen, The Taking of Pelham 123)
 Zoe Saldaña (1978-) American actress of Puerto Rican and Dominican descent
 Kiele Sanchez (1977-) American actress of partially Puerto Rican descent (The Glades)
 Marco Sanchez (1970-) American actor of Cuban descent (Walker, Texas Ranger)
 Merlin Santana (1976–2002) American of Dominican descent (The Cosby Show, Getting By, Under One Roof, The Steve Harvey Show)
 Renoly Santiago (1974-), Puerto Rican-born and raised in Union City, New Jersey
 Tessie Santiago (1975-) American actress of Cuban descent
 Jon Seda (1970-) American actor of Puerto Rican descent
 Diego Serrano (1973-) Ecuadorian-born American actor
 Ebonie Smith (1978-) Puerto Rican-born American former child actress of Dominican and African-American descent (The Jeffersons) 
 Hilary Swank (1974-) American actress and film producer. Her grandmother was of Mexican descent.
 Cindy Taylor (1977-) Paraguayan-born American actress of American and Paraguayan descent
 Paola Turbay (1970-) American actress of Colombian descent
 Alanna Ubach (1975-). American actress of Puerto Rican and Mexican descent
 Jacob Vargas (1971-) Mexican-born American actor
 Nadine Velazquez (1978-) American actress and model of Puerto Rican descent (My Name Is Earl, The League)
 Erik Valdez (1979-) American actor to a father of Mexican, Spanish and Native American descend
 James Vasquez (1972-) American actor and director to a Mexican father
 Sofía Vergara (1972-) Colombian-born American actress
 Vanessa Villela (1978-) Mexican-born American actor
 Michael Saucedo (1970-) American actor of Mexican and Irish descent
 Liza Colón-Zayas (1972-) American actress and playwright of Puerto Rican descent

1980s 
 Jordana Brewster (1980-) Panamanian born American actress (The Fast And The Furious saga).
 Anabelle Acosta (1987-) Cuban-born American actress (Ballers, Quantico)
 Christina Aguilera (1980-) American singer and actress of Ecuadorian descent.
 Jessica Alba (1981-) American actress to a father of Mexican descent.
 Odette Annable (1985-) American actress of Colombian and Cuban descent (House)
 Joe Arquette (1981-) American actor of Mexican descent
 Adrienne Bailon (1983-) American singer, actress and talk show host. Her father is Ecuadorian and her mother is Puerto Rican.
 Stephanie Beatriz (1981-) Argentine-born American actress and model of Colombian and Bolivian descent (Brooklyn Nine-Nine’')
 Alexis Bledel (1981-) American actress of Argentine and Mexican descent  
 Richard Cabral (1984-) American actor of Mexican descent
 Jencarlos Canela (1988-) American singer, songwriter and actor of Cuban descent
 Aimee Carrero (1988-) Dominican-born American actress (Young & Hungry)
 Rafael Casal (1985-) American writer, actor, producer, and showrunner. He is of Irish, Spanish, and Cuban descent.
 David Castañeda (1989-) American actor of Mexican descent (The Umbrella Academy)
 Teresa Castillo (1983-) American actress of Spanish, Mexican, and Chinese ancestry
 Angélica Celaya (1982-) American actress of Mexican descent
 Lisseth Chavez (1989-) American actress of Salvadoran descent
 Ana Brenda Contreras (1986-) American actress of Mexican descent
 Jackie Cruz (1986-) American actress of Dominican descent (Orange Is the New Black)
 Majandra Delfino (1981-) Venezuelan-born American actress and singer.
 Aarón Díaz (1982-) Mexican-born American actor
 Alyssa Diaz (1985-) American actress of Mexican, Colombian and Irish descent (As the World Turns, The Nine Lives of Chloe King)
 Melonie Diaz (1984-) American actress of Puerto Rican descent (Charmed) 
 Alejandro Edda (1984–), Mexican-American actor
 Tamara Feldman (1980-) American actress of Mexican descent
 America Ferrera (1984-) American actress, producer, and director of Honduran descent (Ugly Betty,  Superstore)
 Melissa Fumero (1982-) American actress and director of Cuban descent (Brooklyn Nine-Nine, One Life to Live)
 David Gallagher (1985-) American actor of Cuban and Irish descent (7th Heaven) 
 Jesse Garcia (1982-) American actor of Mexican descent
 Jessica Marie Garcia (1987-) American actress. She is of Mexican and Cuban descent (The Middle, Liv and Maddie, On My Block).
 Miguel Gomez (1985-) Colombian-born American actor
 Julie Gonzalo (1981-) Argentine-born American actress
 Meagan Good (1981-) – American actress. Her paternal grandmother is of Puerto Rican descent.
 Diane Guerrero (1986-) American actress of Colombian descent
 Ryan Guzman (1987-) American actor. His father is Mexican.
 Heather Hemmens (1988-) American actress of Chilean descent
 Callie Hernandez (1988-) American actress. Her father is Mexican and her mother is Swiss-German (Blair Witch, La La Land, The Endless, Alien: Covenant).
 April Lee Hernandez (1980-) American actress of Puerto Rican descent
 Kristin Herrera (1989-) American actress of Spanish and Portuguese descent (Zoey 101, General Hospital)
 Shayne Lamas (1985-) American reality television personality and actress. She is daughter of American actor of Argentine descent Lorenzo Lamas
 William Levy (born William Levy Gutiérrez; 1980-) Cuban-born American actor
 Adrianne León (1987-) American actress of Puerto Rican and Ecuadorian descent
 Josie Loren (1987-) American actress of Cuban descent (Make It or Break It)
 Gabriel Luna (1982-) American actor of Mexican descent (Agents of S.H.I.E.L.D.)
 J. R. Martinez (1983-) American actor. His mother is of Salvadoran origin
 Natalie Martinez (1984-) American actress and model of Cuban descent
 Lindsay Mendez (1983-) American actress of Mexican and Russian Jewish descent
 Alex Meraz (1985-) American actor of Mexican descent
 Alano Miller (1980-) American actor of partial Cuban ancestry
 Christina Milian (1981-) American actress, singer and songwriter of Cuban descent 
 Lin-Manuel Miranda (1980) - American actor, composer, lyricist,  singer, rapper, actor, producer, and playwright, known by his roles in Broadway musicals. He is of mostly Puerto Rican descent, but he also is a quarter Mexican.
 Daniella Monet (1989-) American actress and singer of Chilean, Croatan and Italian descent
 Natalie Morales (1985-) American actress of Cuban descent (The Middleman).
 Patricia Mota (1982-)  Dominican-born American actress
 Frankie Muniz (1985-) American actor to a Puerto Rican father (Malcolm in the Middle) 
 Carlos Navarro (1980-) American actor and radio personality of Peruvian and Cuban descent.
 Victor Ortiz (1987-) American professional boxer and film actor of Mexican descent
 Brina Palencia (1984-) American voice actress (One Piece, Fairy Tail)
 J. D. Pardo (1980-) American actor of Argentinian and Salvadoran descent
 Sara Paxton (1988-) American actress of Mexican descent
 Carlos PenaVega (1989-) American actor and singer. His father is of Spanish and Venezuelan descent, and his mother is Dominican (Big Time Rush) 
 Walter Perez (1982-) American actor of Mexican descent.
 Daniella Pineda (1987-) American actress, writer, and comedian of Mexican descent
 Aubrey Plaza (1984-) American actress of Puerto Rican and European descent
 Bridget Powers (1980-) American pornographic actress of Guatemalan descent
 Reagan Gomez-Preston (1980-) American actress of Puerto Rican and African American descent (The Parent 'Hood, The Cleveland Show) 
 Francia Raisa (1988-) American actress. She is of Mexican and Honduran descent (Bring It On: All or Nothing, The Secret Life of the American Teenager  and Grown-ish). 
 Monica Raymund (1986-) American actress to a Dominican mother (Chicago Fire).
 Nicole Richie (1981-) American actress of partial Mexican descent
 Emily Rios (1989-) American actress of Mexican descent 
 Naya Rivera (1987-2020) American actress of Puerto Rican, African American and German descent  (Glee)
 Elizabeth Rodriguez (1980-) American actress of Puerto Rican descent (Orange Is the New Black) 
 Genesis Rodriguez (1987-) is an American actress. She is daughter of Venezuelan singer José Luis Rodríguez
 Gina Rodriguez (1984-) American actress to Puerto Rican parents (Jane the Virgin)
 Gabrielle Ruiz (1984-) American actress of Mexican descent
Teresa Ruiz (1988-) Mexican-born American actress
 Rosa Salazar (1985-) Canadian-born American actress of Peruvian and French descent.
Claudia Salinas (1983-) Mexican-born American actress and model
 Ray Santiago (1984-) American actor of Puerto Rican descent (Ash vs Evil Dead)
 Josh Segarra (1986-) American actor of Puerto Rican descent (The Electric Company, Sirens, and Arrow)
 Jamie-Lynn Sigler (1981-) American actress and singer of Jewish Greek-Romanian and Cuban descent (The Sopranos).
 Charise Castro Smith (1983-), actress of Cuban descent
 Tessa Thompson (1983-) American actress and singer. Her father is of Afro-Panamanian descent, while her mother is of Caucasian and Mexican ancestry (Selma, Creed, Thor: Ragnarok)
 Michael Trevino (1985-) American actor of Mexican descent (The Vampire Diaries, Roswell, New Mexico)
 Brittany Underwood (1988-) American actress and singer of English and Colombian descent (One Life to Live,  Hollywood Heights)
 Wilmer Valderrama (1980-) American actor, producer, singer and television personality (That '70s Show, From Dusk till Dawn: The Series). He is of Venezuelan descent.
 Carlos Valdes (1989-) Colombian-born American actor and singer (The Flash)
 Alexa Vega (1988-) American actress and singer to a Colombian father (Spy Kids) 
 Christina Vidal (1981-) American actress of Puerto Rican descent (Taina) 
 Ana Villafañe (1989-) American actress of Cuban and Salvadoran descent.
 Carolina Ravassa (1985-)  Colombian-born American actress

 1990s 
 Tyler Alvarez (1997-) American actor of Cuban and Puerto Rican descent (Every Witch Way, American Vandal)
 Moisés Arias (1994-) American actor of Colombian descent (Hannah Montana) 
 Jake T. Austin (1994-) American actor. His mother is of Puerto Rican, Argentine and Spanish descent (Wizards of Waverly Place)
 Melissa Barrera (1991-) Mexican-born American actress
 Diego Boneta (1990-) Mexican-born American actor
 Camila Cabello (1997-) Cuban-born American actress and singer
 Jason Canela (1992-) American actor of Cuban descent
 Sofia Carson (1993-) American actress and singer of Columbian descent (Descendants)
 Isabella Castillo (1994-) Cuban-born American actress and singer 
 Raquel Castro (1994-) American actress, singer and songwriter to a Puerto Rican father and a mother of Italian and Jewish descent
 David Castro (1996-) American actor. He is brother of Raquel Castro
 Eduardo Franco (1997-) American actor of Mexican descent (Stranger Things)
 Seychelle Gabriel (1991-) American actress. Her paternal grandfather is of Mexican origin (Falling Skies)
 Hunter Gomez (1991-) - American actor of Mexican descent.
 Isabella Gomez (1998-) Colombian-born American actress (One Day at a Time)
 Selena Gomez (1992-) American actress and singer of Mexican descent
 Froy Gutierrez (1998-) American actor and singer of Mexican descent
 Kathleen Herles - (1990-) American voice actress of Peruvian descent (Dora the Explorer, Go, Diego, Go!)
 Ricardo Hurtado (1999-) American actor of Nicaraguan descent (School of Rock)
 Adam Irigoyen (1997-) American actor, singer, rapper and dancer of Cuban descent
 Victoria Justice (1993-) American actress and singer. Her mother is of Puerto Rican origin (Zoey 101)
 Q'orianka Kilcher - (1990-) German-born American actress of Peruvian and German descent
 Stefania LaVie Owen (1997-) American actress to a Cuban mother (Running Wilde, The Carrie Diaries, Sweet Tooth)
 Demi Lovato (1992-) American actress of Nuevomexicano origin.
 Julio Macias (1990-) Mexican-born American actor. 
Ruby Modine - (1990-) American actress to a Puerto Rican mother.
 Lindsey Morgan (1990-) American actress of Mexican and Irish descent (The 100)
 Christian Navarro (1991-) American actor of Puerto Rican descent (13 Reasons Why) 
 Dylan O'Brien (1991-) American actor of Spanish descent (Teen Wolf and The Maze Runner)
 Hayley Orrantia (1994-) American actress, singer, and songwriter. Her grandfather is of Mexican descent and she identifies herself as Latina.
 Alycia Pascual-Peña (1999-) American actress (Saved by the Bell).
 Tyler Posey (born Tyler Garcia Posey; 1991-) American actor and musician of Mexican descent (Teen Wolf)
 Cierra Ramirez (1995-) American actress and singer of Colombian and Mexican descent (The Fosters)
 Danny Ramirez (1997-) - American actor of Colombian and Mexican descent. 
 Anthony Ramos (1991-) American actor of Puerto Rican descent.
 Tony Revolori (né Quiñonez; 1996-) American actor of Guatemalan descent (Spider-Man: Homecoming and Spider-Man: Far From Home) 
 Michaela Jaé Rodriguez (1991-) American actress and Singer. One of her grandparent was Puerto Rican.
 Rico Rodriguez (1998-) American actor of Mexican descent (Modern Family)
 Caitlin Sanchez (1996-) American actress of Cuban descent
 Bianca Santos (1990-) American actress of Cuban and Brazilian descent (The Fosters)
 Christian Serratos (1990-) American actress of Mexican and Italian descent (The Walking Dead)
 Jeremy Suarez (1990) American actor, film producer and director of Puerto Rican descent (The Bernie Mac Show)
 Julia Goldani Telles (1995-) - American-born Brazilian-raised actress and ballet dancer. She is of Mexican and Brazilian descent (The Affair).
 Bella Thorne (1997-) American actress. Her father is of Cuban origin.
 Anthony De La Torre (1993-) American actor, singer, songwriter and guitarist of Cuban descent
 Makenzie Vega (1994-) American actress of Colombian and American descent. She is the sister of Alexa Vega.
 Jamila Velazquez (1995-) American singer and actress of Dominican and Puerto Rican descent
 Sasha Calle (1995-) American actress of Colombian descent

 2000s 
 Allegra Acosta (2002-) American actress of Mexican descent (Marvel's Runaways)
 Izabella Alvarez (2004-) American actress and voice artist (The Casagrandes, Shameless, Westworld, Walk the Prank)
 Cree Cicchino (2002-) American actress of Italian and Ecuadorian descent
 Michael Garza (2000-) American actor of Mexican descent (Scary Stories to Tell in the Dark)
 Madison De La Garza (2001-) American actress of Mexican descent (Desperate Housewives)
 Xochitl Gomez (born 2006) American actress of Mexican descent (Marvel Cinematic Universe)
 Anthony Gonzalez (2004-) American actor and Voice actor of Guatemalan descent (Coco). 
 Lilimar Hernandez (2000-) Venezuelan-born American actress of Cuban descent
 Skai Jackson (2002-) American actress, YouTuber, and author. She is of Afro Honduran and Afro American descent (Jessie, Bunk'd'') 
 Xolo Maridueña (2001-) American actor of Mexican, Cuban and Ecuadorean heritage (Cobra Kai).
 Isabela Moner (2001-) American actress, voice actress, singer, songwriter, dancer and ukulele player. Her mother is Peruvian.
 Jenna Ortega (2002-) American actress of Mexican and Puerto Rican descent (Jane the Virgin, Wednesday) 
 Alexys Nycole Sanchez (2003-) American actress

Year of birth unknown 
 Seidy López - Mexican-born American actress and director
 Elena Tovar - Mexican-born American actress

See also 
 List of Hispanic and Latino Americans

References

Hispanic and Latino American